Jelenic may refer to:
 Jelenić, a Serbo-Croatian surname
 Jelenič, a Slovene surname